The Efik are an ethnic group located primarily in southern Nigeria, and western Cameroon. Within Nigeria, the Efik can be found in the present-day Cross River State and Akwa Ibom state. The Efik speak the Efik language which is a member of the Benue–Congo subfamily of the Niger-Congo language group. The Efik refer to themselves as Efik Eburutu, Ifa Ibom, Eburutu and Iboku.

The name Efik first appears in historical literature in the nineteenth century. The most popular historical accounts of Efik migration attest a movement from Ibom in Arochukwu to Uruan and from Uruan to numerous settlements along the lower Cross river. The bulk of the Efik can be found in Calabar. Prior to 1905, Old Calabar was a term used to describe the Efik settlements of Duke Town, Creek Town, Old town, Cobham town, Henshaw town, Adiabo and Mbiabo (consisting of Mbiabo edere, Mbiabo Ikot Offiong and Mbiabo Ikoneto). The Efik have also been referred to as "Calabar people" in historical literature. The term "Calabar people" was particularly popular prior to the nineteenth century and was synonymous to the Efik.

Efik society consists of various clans which were originally known as "Esien Efik itiaba" and later known in the 21st century as "Esien Efik Duopeba". The original seven clans are scattered between Cross River state and Akwa Ibom state and consist of Iboku (Duke town, Henshaw town, Creek town and Cobham town), Obutong, Adiabo, Mbiabo (Mbiabo Edere, Mbiabo Ikot Offiong, Mbiabo Ikoneto), Enwang, Usukakpa and Abayen. The last three clans had greatly dwindled in number and many of their members are believed to have been miscegenated into other Efik clans. Ibonda (an Efut clan) has sometimes been appended to Adiabo as one of the seven Efik clans. The bulk of the Enwang and Usukakpa are located in the present-day Akwa Ibom state. 

Modern Efik society is a melting pot of people of diverse origin. Due to the rise of Calabar as a commercial centre since the 18th century, Efik settlements experienced a high rate of inward migration consisting of Sierra Leoneans, Lebanese, Cameroonians, Jamaicans and several other communities. Children of Efik maternal descent are still regarded as Efik and have contributed to the development of the Efik society. Due to the volume of cultural exchange, many other ethnic groups have often been regarded as being one with the Efik such as Kiong and Efut.

The Efik were noted for their involvement in the slave trade were they acted as slave traders and middlemen between the inland slave traders and the Europeans. After the decline of the slave trade, the Efik transitioned into the business of exporting palm oil from the Cross river. Other trading items sold by the Efik included rubber, ivory, barwood and redwood. Throughout the centuries, Efik traders traded with the Portuguese, Dutch, English and French.

Etymology
The name "Efik" translates to "Oppressors" and is derived from the Efik-Ibibio verb root "Fik". The first letter of the word is correctly written as "Ẹ" and denotes plurality.  Several theories have been propounded on the origin of the word. One theory propounded by Okon and Nkpanam Ekereke asserts that the term "Efuk" was a word of defiance and an expression used by the Ibibio man when in a fit of rage. Ekereke and Ekereke further assert that the word was later changed to "Efik". This theory appears to be isolated as other Ibibio writers do not narrate that such terms were used by the Ibibio. Another theory which is narrated by Forde and Jones states that the name "Efik" translates to "Tyrants" or "He who oppresses" and was the name of which the Efik called themselves after they had settled at Creek town.

Origin

The history of the Efik is one of the most documented in subsaharan Africa. Due to the role they played during the era of the triangular trade, their prominence in literature and art, there has been a lot of academic scholarship on the people. There are several theories regarding the origin of the Efik people. The three most popular theories include an Igbo origin, Ibibio origin and Palestinian origin.

Igbo origin theory
The earliest proponent of the Igbo origin was William Baikie who stated in his 1856 publication, "All the coast dialects from One to Old Kalabar, are, either directly or indirectly, connected with Igbo, which later Dr Latham informs me is certainly related to the Kafir class". Baikie said Ibibio are traced to the Igbo. James Beale Horton made a similar assertion in 1868 where he asserted that all the communities of the Niger-delta are traced to the Igbo. Some oral accounts by early Efik men also support the Igbo origin of the Efik. One of such accounts was given at a court case by Prince Bassey Duke in 1917 where he stated, "The Efiks were originally Ibo descendants. They came from Mbiak Creek in Ibibio country." References to the Igbo origin of the Efik were also made at the Hart's enquiry into the Obongship dispute where Etubom Efiom Obo Effanga asserted that the term "Iboku" meant quarrelsome Igbos.

Ibibio origin theory
The Ibibio origin of the Efik is one of the most popular among scholars. Proponents of this theory range from missionaries, explorers, colonial anthropologists and later historians. While some explorers describe the Efik as travellers who past through the Ibibio country, others assert that the Efik are of Ibibio stock. Among the earliest proponents of the Ibibio origin theory are Consul Hutchinson who stated, "The present inhabitants of Duke town, Old town and Creek town are descendants of the Egbo shary or Ibibio tribe up the Cross River."
Colonial Anthropologist M.D.W. Jeffreys also stated, "There is reason to believe that a considerable portion of a small Ibibio clan called Ebrutu or Eburutu was the earliest stock of the Efik; for, when the missionaries settled in 1846 at Old Calabar amongst these people for the first time, it was found that they called themselves not Efik but Ebrutu or Ebrutu Efik." Jeffreys assertion regarding Eburutu being a single Ibibio clan is proven false by earlier definitions of Eburutu by Rev. Hugh 

Goldie. Goldie describes Eburutu as a country that consists of various ethnic groups. This is further proven by Talbot who proves that other ethnicities appended the name "Eburutu" or "Oburutu" to their ethnic names.

Oriental origin theory
The Oriental original is most popular among indigenous Efik historians such as E.U. Aye and Eyo Okon Akak. This theory asserts that the Efik migrated from Palestine or somewhere close to Palestine. The main proponents of what is described as "Palestinean origin" is Eyo Okon Akak who wrote the book, "The Palestine origin of the Efik". Prior to Akak, the theory were proposed at the Hart's enquiry by Chief Offiong Abasi Ntiero Effiwatt and Etubom Ededem Ekpenyong Oku.

History

Pre-Trans Atlantic slave trade era
Prior to the inception of the transatlantic slave trade, the Efik had experienced a series of migration before their arrival along the coasts of Old Calabar. Several accounts have been narrated on the migration of the Efik before their arrival at Old Calabar. The earliest accounts are narrated in the second half of the 19th century by Explorers and missionaries. The most popular migration account within the Nigerian space asserts that the Efik people lived at Ibom in the present-day Arochukwu and migrated from Ibom to Uruan.

Uruan
Oral tradition has it that the Efik arrived Uruan in four groups i.e. Iboku, Enwang, Usukakpa and Abayen. At Uruan, they were ruled by a number of priest-kings . Aye provides the following names among these priest-kings including Ema Atai Iboku, Ekpe Atai Iboku, Ukpong Atai Iboku. A number of reasons have been given on why the Efik left Uruan. One theory states that the Efik and Uruan had separate religious customs and the Efik refused to worship the Uruan deity Atakpor Uruan Inyang. This theory was narrated at the Hart's enquiry by Etubom Ededem Ekpenyong Oku but has been criticised by Uruan writers such as Dominic Essien. Essien points out that Atakpor Uruan Inyang is one of the Efik deities and asserts that among the Uruan exists the saying "Ke Ndem Efik Iboku, Atakpor ke Ekuk", which can be interpreted to mean "Where there is the Efik deity, there is also Atakpor Uruan to share with it." Essien's criticism is supported by the fact that in some Efik trado-religious songs, Atakpor Uruan is greatly extolled. Another reason given by Etubom Ededem Ekpenyong Oku asserts that the Uruan accused the Efik of wizardry and of being responsible for the frequent seizure of their children by crocodiles. Oku adds that the Uruan were adverse to the Efik custom of burying strangers with their dead and did not share in the practice carried out by the Efik. Another theory states that there was a disagreement between an Efik woman known as Abasi and an Uruan woman. Abasi is said to have borrowed an axe from an Uruan woman and had broken the axe. When the Uruan woman realised that Abasi had broken her axe, she insisted that the axe should be repaired. When the husband of the Uruan woman learnt of the issue, he wanted to fight the Efik. Abasi's husband insisted that the problem should be resolved by the chiefs. Abasi was angered by the Uruan woman and cursed the Uruan people who started to punish her for her insubordination. The Efik came to her defence and the dispute escalataed Legend has it that this was the last straw that led to the Uruan-Efik war (known in Efik as ) which led to the exit of the Efik from the Uruan country.

Ikpa Ene and Ndodoghi
On leaving the Uruan country, the Efik migrated to Ikpa Ene which is nicknamed Akani Obio Efik(). Ikpa Ene was a virgin island on the banks of the Cross river. The island is believed to be named after a fisherman from Mbiabo known as Ene Ankot. According to Aye, "Ikpa Ene could not carry the bulk of Iboku population, Ndodoghi had to accommodate what spilt over, and the two settlements, still under one rule, were separated by the left branch of the river which became their "inland sea".
After the Efik had settled at Ikpa Ene, a party of men from Uruan arrived at Ikpa Ene. The men were wet and complained of hunger and fatigue. The Efik having pity on these men gave them food and showed them hospitality. At night when everyone had gone to sleep, the men from Uruan rose up and began to slaughter their hosts. When the Efik realised what was going on, they rose to their feet and fought back. A captured invader confessed that they were set to retrieve royal emblems which they believed the Efik had taken with them when they left Uruan. The items believed to have been taken include Ikpaya (woven raffia robe), Akata (throne) and Ayang (Broom). Oku attests that it was the attack on the Efik that made them decide to leave Ikpa Ene as they realised they were still too close to their enemies. Aye argues that the Efik could not have taken the royal emblem of the Uruan people as they would have already had their own royal emblem. The Uruan invasion at Ikpa Ene is believed to be the origin of the Efik saying, "Ama okut Ibibio, ku nọ enye ikañ, Idem amasat Ibibio eyewot owo"(). When many of the Efik had left for Ndodoghi, a series of unfortunate events occurred. The Efik bard Adiaha Etim Anua recites in her 1910 ballad that "Mkpana Ndodoghi Edik. Ema Atai Ema Atai, Edidem, Biop sai.". At Ndodoghi, the Efik priest-king Ema Atai Ema Atai died and was succeeded by his son Eyo Ema Atai Ema Atai Iboku. It is believed that it was at Ndodoghi that many of the Abayen clan had died from crocodile attacks. Talbot asserts that a great cotton tree had fallen down on many of the Abayen and in their pride of numbers, they believed they could hold the cotton tree. The outcome of the fall of the tree led to several deaths in their clan.
Due to the number of unfortunate incidents at Ikpa Ene and Ndodoghi, the Efik sought to leave these islands. There are said to be at least three mass migration from Ndodoghi. One account narrates that the Mbiabo group left first to their present location while the Iboku, Enwang and other clans were still at Ndodoghi.  The Adiabo group is believed to have left to their present location after the Mbiabo exodus. The largest group moved to Creek town from Ndodoghi led by the priest-king Eyo Ema Atai.

Creek Town
It is uncertain the specific year that the Efik arrived Creek Town. Several periods have been estimated by foreign scholars and indigenous historians. Aye dates the arrival of the Efik in Creek Town to the fourteenth century. Latham hypothesizes that the Efik may have arrived before the middle of the seventeenth century. K.K. Nair dates the arrival of the Efik towards the end of the seventeenth century or the beginning of the eighteenth century. Stephen D. Behrendt and Eric J. Graham revealed in a 2003 publication that by the time the first documented European sailing vessel arrived in 1625, the Efik had already settled at Creek Town and Old Town.
There are different narratives on the arrival of the Efik at Creek Town. According to Simmons, "Most Informants maintain that the first people to Inhabit Creek Town were Efut fishermen from the southern Cameroons." Simmons assertion which was made in his 1958 dissertation is similarly reiterated at the Hart's enquiry in 1964 by chiefs such as Chief Efiom Obo Effanga of Obutong. Other narratives at the Hart's enquiry do not make mention of the Efut. Aye in 2000 does not mention the Efut as being the primary occupants. What is most certain is that the Efik arrived Creek Town led by Edidem Eyo Ema Atai together with Oku Atai Atai Ema Atai, Ukpong Atai Atai Ema Atai, Adim Atai Atai Ema Atai, Efiom Ekpo Efiom Ekpo and several others. Eyo Ema's people occupied Otung in the south of Creek Town, Adim Atai and Ukpong Atai occupied the east and Efiom Ekpo's family occupied the Adakuko in the west. internal dissensions and population expansion led to the movement of several families from Creek Town to Obutong, Atakpa, Nsidung and Ekoretonko.

16th century

Founding of Obutong (Old town)
It is uncertain when Obutong was founded but most Efik scholars hypothesize that it was founded in the 16th century. Several accounts have been given on the migration from Creek town to Obutong. One theory asserts that Ukpong Atai Atai Ema Atai, Adim Atai Atai Ema Atai and other co-founders founded Obutong after one of Eyo Ema's people was killed during a wrestling match with Ukpong Atai at Creek town. On their exit from Obutong, they are believed to have sought the permission of Oku Atai to use the Ntinya. At the time of their exit from Creek town, the reigning monarch of Creek town was their half brother Oku Atai Atai Ema Atai. On the founding of Obutong, Colonial anthropologist M.D.W. Jeffreys states that a disruption among the Okobo around the town of Ekeya in the Eket district led to the founding of Obutong. Jeffreys theory is unpopular with a large majority of the Efik. Another theory narrated by Chief Efiom Obo Effanga of Obutong asserts that Antia Ekot Otong founded Obutong. Antia Ekot Otong is regarded as one of the descendants of the patriarch Otong Ama Ide.

17th century

Founding of Atakpa (Duke town)
By the seventeenth century, more Efik settlements had been founded. Although Duke town is believed to have been occupied since the 15th century by the Enwang, it was not until the 17th century that the Efiom Ekpo families moved in large waves to the site. Prior to the arrival of the Efiom Ekpo group, oral tradition has it that when some Efik migrated to Creek town from Ndodoghi, The Enwang did not join them but migrated to the present site of Duke town. The Enwang are believed to have ruled Atakpa for a number of years. Their king on the eastern Calabar coast was known as Ating Anua Efiom. Several events at Creek town later led to a wave of migration from Creek town to Duke town. At Creek town, the Efik ruler was Efiom Ekpo Efiom Ekpo who had a number of children including Nsa Efiom, Edem Efiom, Okoho Efiom and Odo Efiom. Okoho Efiom bore twins whose paternal parentage have often been debated. Due to the custom of killing twins, Edem Efiom is said to have aided Okoho Efiom in sneaking out of Creek town to Nsutana. Nsutana was a dreaded island where twins were abandoned to die. Okoho Efiom bore the twins at Nsutana and raised them up for years. When the twins were older, they left for the opposite end of the island to Duke town. The Enwang people who were fishing at Duke town saw the twins approaching and fled in terror saying "Mbiomo oduk ine"(). The Enwang people moved to the present site of Henshaw town.

Trade
Efik traders played a major role during the era of the Transatlantic slave trade. The Efik acted as the middlemen between the European vessels and the inland slave traders. Although Behrendt and Graham reveal that Calabar had been a major trading port since the first half of the seventeenth century, Efik historians such as Aye assert that the Efik had been trading with the Europeans since the last quarter of the 15th century. Aye uses Adiaha Etim Anwa's ballad as one of the basis for his hypothesis. 
The earliest list of Efik traders is provided in Jean Barbot's manuscript which was later printed in 1732. Barbot documents that between 1698 and 1699, payments for provisions were made at Calabar to the following chiefs; Duke Aphrom, King Robin, Mettinon, King Ebrero, King John, King Oyo, William King Agbisherea, Robin King Agbisherea, and Old King Robin. It was common for Efik traders to take up trading names during the period of the transatlantic slave trade. Efik names were often anglicised to gain the trust of European traders. Names such as Okon became Hogan, Orok became Duke, Akabom became Cobham, Ene became Henry, Asibong became Archibong. The name "Agbisherea" (also known as Egbosherry) appended in the names of the two kings listed by Barbot, was the name of the country, on the coast of which they traded from. Aphrom was a corruption of Ephraim which was an anglicised form of the Efik name Efiom. Some of the kings have been identified in the past by Etubom Ukorebi Ukorebi Asuquo in Aye's Efik people. According to Asuquo, Asibong Eso of Obutong was Old King Robin; Ekpenyong Efa of Adiabo was King John; Ani Eniang Nkot of Mbiabo Ikoneto was Robin King Agbisherea; Oku Ukpong Eton Ani of Mbiabo Ikot Offiong was William King Agbisherea; while Ukorebi Neneng Esien Ndem Ndem of Obomitiat Ikoneto was King Ebrero
Originally, the Efik obtained slaves by going to war with other communities or creating confusion in other communities. In the case of the latter, in the heat of the confusion, villagers would be kidnapped and sent to Calabar were they were sold. This is evident in a testimony by Isaac Parker, a ship-keeper who lived at Duke town in 1765 for 5 months. According to Parker, When there, Dick Ebro' asking him to go to war with him, he complied, and accordingly having sitted out and armed the canoes, they went up the river, lying under the bushes in the day when they came near a village ; and at night flying up to the village, and taking hold of every one they could see. These they handcuffed, brought down to the canoes, and so proceeded up the river, till they got to the amount of 45, with whom they returned to New town, where sending to the captains of the shipping, they divided them among the ships.
By the 18th and 19th centuries, the Efik strategy for filling the international demand for slaves was via obtaining slaves from inland slave traders such as Eniong, Ndokki and Arochukwu.

18th century

Western education
Prior to the arrival of the missionaries in 1846, many Efik traders were fluent in English and a number of African and European languages. Efik traders could speak, write and read the English language. Many families sent their children to European captains to teach them English and the processes involved in the international trade. The earliest documented letter to an English captain from a chief of Old Calabar was written in 1770. The diary of Antera Duke, an Efik, is the only surviving record from an African slave-trading house. Antera Duke also known as Ntiero Edem Efiom was an Efik trader whose diary reveals several daily activities in Old Calabar between 1785 and 1788.

Ekpe society

Law and order in Efik society was maintained via a number of secret societies. Some of the oldest of these societies were Nyana Nyaku and Nsibidi. The Ekpe society is estimated by most foreign scholars to have been introduced into Old Calabar in the 18th century. Ekpe is first mentioned in the historical literature of Old Calabar in the 1770s.  According to Rev. Hope Waddell, Foreign commerce soon brought Calabar affairs into such a state, that the want of a bond of union among the different families, and of a supreme authority to enforce peace and order between equals and rivals, became apparent; and the Egbo institution was adopted. It was found in operation among a tribe down the coast towards Camaroons, but was improved and extended in its new field of operations.

1841–1892
The year 1841 marked the official signing of papers by Efik kings to stop the exportation of slaves from Old Calabar. These papers were signed by the reigning monarchs of Creek town and Duke town who were Eyo Honesty II and Eyamba V.  King Eyamba and King Eyo had written letters to the British requesting that they bring in teachers to teach them trade and commerce and missionaries to aid them to know more about God. The first missionaries arrived in 1846. Among these missionaries were Rev. Hope Waddell, Samuel Edgerley and four others. These missionaries together with King Eyo Honesty II brought several changes to Old Calabar society. Laws were passed to halt several practices regarded as unchristian. Among these laws were the Abolition of twin-killings, abolition of the esere bean ordeal, abolition of human sacrifices and several other practices.

Missionary arrival
As the slave trade was declining due to the strong global campaign against it, the effects on slave trading ports along the African coast was greatly experienced. At Old Calabar,  traders had slowly started transitioning completely into the lucrative palm oil trade. Due to the fall in global demand for slaves and several other factors, the kings and chiefs of Old Calabar wrote to the British requesting that they send teachers and missionaries to Old Calabar to establish industries and introduce the religion of the white man to them. One of such letters written by King Eyamba V and the chiefs of Old Calabar states:
Now we settle treaty for not sell slave, I must tell you something, I want your Queen to do for we. Now we can't sell slaves again we must have too much man for country; and want something for make work and trade, and if we could get seed for cotton and coffee we could make trade. Plenty sugar cane live here and if some man must come for teach book proper, and make all men saby God like white man, and then we go on for same fashion. We thank you too much for what thing you come do for keep thing right. Long time we no look Man-of-War as Blount promise one Frenchman come make plenty palaver for slave when we can't get them. You been do very proper for we, and now we want to keep proper mouth. I hope some Man-of-War come sometime with proper captain all same you look out and help we keep word when French Man-of-War come. What I want for dollar side is a fine coat and sword all same I tell you and the rest in copper rods. I hope Queen Victoria and young prince will live long time and we get good friend. Also i want bomb and shell.

I am your best friend
King Eyamba V
King of all blackman
Letters were also sent by King Eyo Honesty II to introduce missionaries and technocrats into the country with emphasis on the latter. These lettere were heeded to and in April 1846, the first missionaries arrived Old Calabar.

Bombing of Obutong
The destruction of Obutong occurred in 1854. On the death of Chief Willy Tom Robins, a number of rituals were performed. A number of people were hanged, shot and buried with the late chief according to the custom. These atrocities angered the missionaries and European captains alike. The breach of agreement to halt such practices was punished by blowing Ekpe on Obutong and forbidding funeral rites of the chief until the murderers were brought to justice. The missionaries respected the native law but the European Captains acted rashly and desired that an example be set on Obutong. The Captains wrote the acting consul who was stationed at Fernando Po. They insisted that Obutong be completely destroyed. Although the missionaries and rulers of Creek town and Duke town protested, their protests fell on deaf ears. Cannons were shot at the town and every house was levelled to the ground. It took several years before the town was rebuilt.

Language

The Efik people speak the Efik language, which is a Benue–Congo language of the Cross River family. Due to the peregrinations of Efik traders across the lower Cross River region, The Efik language was regarded as the language of commerce in the Cross river region. The Efik language also borrows words from other ethnic groups such as Balondo, Oron, Efut, Okoyong, Efiat and Ekoi (Qua).
The Efik language was also spoken in several communities in Western Cameroon. As of 1877, Alexander Ross reported that thirteen towns in the Cameroon region speak Efik and had an aggregate population of about 22,000. Communities within the Calabar metropolis such as Efut, Kiong and Qua also speak and understand the Efik language. Due to the support of the missionaries, the Efik language became the language of religion. During the colonial era, The Efik language was the only language taught in schools in many parts of the present-day Cross River and Akwa Ibom state.

Demographics

Efik populations are found in the following regions:
Cross River State, Nigeria
Akwa Ibom State, Nigeria
Bioko, Equatorial Guinea
Western Cameroon

Culture

Secret societies
Secret societies aided in the maintaining of law and order at Old Calabar. Among these secret societies were Ekpe, Obon and Nsibidi.

Ekpe

The Ekpe society may be regarded as one of the most important institutions among the Efik people. The society is believed to have been introduced in Calabar from Usahadet. On the appending of the Ekpe institution to its list of secret societies, the Ekpe society was reformed and adapted to suit the needs of the Efik people. Ekpe translates to Leopard in the Efik language and is believed to be a spirit that resides in the forest. The Ekpe spirit cannot be seen by the uninitiated and is represented by Idem Iquo, a masquerade dressed in Esịk, a multicoloured costume decorated with other traditional accoutrements. The society is divided into five main grades such as Nkanda, Oku akama, Nyamkpe, Okpoho and Ebonko. Each grade has a chieftain or an Obong. According to E.U. Aye, Originally Ekpe Fraternity was for religious purposes, but as the Calabar community became complicated owing to the new wealth which the early trade with Europeans brought it was. quickly adapted to fulfil other economic and civil functions. It proved to be the source of supreme authority in all Efik towns, and its institutions provided, in the past, the highest court whose verdicts transcended all else. Ekpe could take life and could give it; it could condemn a whole town to a heavy fine and was promptly paid; it could punish offenders and could forgive; even kings and Obongs could never escape Ekpe laws and edicts.
Due to the Obutong massacre of 1765 and several other incidents, the Ekpe society of Old Calabar was transformed into the Abakuá cult in Cuba, the Bonkó cult in Bioko and the Abakuya dance in mainland Equatorial Guinea.

Cuisine

The Efik people are well known for a diverse number of cuisines. Among these cuisines include Ekpang nkukwo, Edikang Ikong, Afia efere, Anyan Ekpang, Afang soup and several others. Originally, items such as onions (Oyim mbakara) was rare in Efik meals. Large amounts of pepper was also uncommon in Efik cuisines. Prior to the introduction of industrialised cubic-shaped seasonings such as maggi and know, Crayfish was used to make meals more spicy. Some meals have been mentioned often in the 19th century historical literature of Old Calabar. Among these included Yams, Fufu and an unidentified type of black soup frequently mentioned in 19th century Old Calabar literature. Several meals were composed of yam such as Usuñ abia, Iwụk abia, Afia abia, Ọsọbọ abia, Edifrai abia and Ọfọp abia. Meals such as Iwewe were fed to children and old people with no teeth or fragile teeth. Iwewe is a type of boiled yam mashed with a small amount of palm oil and stirred with a spoon. Iwewe is also regarded as a sacrificial meal often prepared for the Efik deities.
Meat and fish are the major sources of protein in Efik cuisines. Animals such as goats, chicken and dogs are consumed in Efik cuisine. Cow meat was also consumed but the Efik native cow was rarely eaten or milked by the Efik. The Efik native cow was regarded with some amount of reverence and was mainly killed on rare occasions such as the festival for the installation of a new priest king.
The Efik also manufacture a number of beverages such as Mmịn Efik (Palm wine), Ufọfọp (Native gin), Lemon grass tea (Nnyannyaña), Mmịn Eyop (Eyop wine). Palm wine is acquired by making an incision on the palm tree, a process known as "tapping". After the tapping process, the wine is left to ferment for five hours. Alcoholic content may be increased via adding the red bark of Edat (Sacoglottis gabonensis) to the wine. Ufọfọp (native gin) is distilled from palm wine and is sometimes mixed with the bark of Edat to increase the alcoholic content.

Clothing and adornment

Prior to the introduction of European-styled clothing, the Efik wore loin clothes made of Raffia. The fibre of the leaf-stalk of a palm was made into a thread and woven to make clothes and bags. Raffia palm clothing could also be exported from other communities especially when a community made the best raffia clothing. Ikpaya a royal type of gown also made from raffia. Ikpaya is now worn by an Obong-elect during the traditional coronation ceremony. Women wore a number of brass rings on their legs and arms. Ivory bracelets were worn by wealthy women.
With the inception of the transatlantic slave trade, a number of foreign clothes were introduced into Efik society. Oral tradition holds that a type of clothing known as "Itu ita" was the earliest fabric imported into Old Calabar. This material is believed to have been imported by the Portuguese (Oboriki). The Portuguese are said to have arrived in masted ships. The name Itu ita translates to three manatees and is named because the masts of the ship resembled the manatee (Itu). Some other clothings introduced into the market include smit, brutanya, isadọhọ and nkisi. 
The missionaries who arrived in 1846 contributed to the changes in women's attire in Efik society. Over the years, the Victorian dress has been modified and given what is regarded as a dignified African look. In modern-day Efik society, Ọnyọnyọ is worn on various occasions such as weddings and traditional events. The dress is often worn with ornaments such as necklaces and earrings made of coral beads. During weddings, the bride wears at least two different Ọnyọnyọ. The traditional attire for men usually consists of a white long-sleeved shirt, a long broad soft neckerchief or scarf of costly material and a wrapper tied around the waist.

See also

 Efik religion
 Efik mythology
 Efik literature
 Efik calendar
 Efik name 
 Nsibidi
 Ekpe
 Calabar
 Duke Town

References

Bibliography
  
 
  
 
  
 
 
 .

External links

 Efik National Association, Inc.
 https://web.archive.org/web/20151222092842/http://sunnewsonline.com/new/pa-effiong-ukpong-aye-1918-2012/

 
Tribes of Africa
African civilizations
Ethnic groups in Nigeria
Ethnic groups in Cameroon
Indigenous peoples of the Niger Delta
Cross River (Nigeria)